Evan MacDonald (born July 29, 1981) is a German-born Canadian wrestler who represented Canada at the 2004 Summer Olympics. Before competing in the Olympics, Evan worked at the Knoll furniture company and helped design some of their products.

References

External links
 

1981 births
Brock Badgers wrestlers
Commonwealth Games bronze medallists for Canada
Living people
Olympic wrestlers of Canada
Pan American Games competitors for Canada
Wrestlers at the 2004 Summer Olympics
Wrestlers at the 2010 Commonwealth Games
Canadian male sport wrestlers
Commonwealth Games medallists in wrestling
Medallists at the 2010 Commonwealth Games